Trachypepla hieropis is a moth of the family Oecophoridae first described by Edward Meyrick in 1892. It is endemic to New Zealand and has been collected in both the North and South Islands. This species inhabits native forest and the larvae feed on leaf litter. Adults are on the wing in December and are attracted to light.

Taxonomy
This species was first described in 1892 by Edward Meyrick using a male specimen collected by George Hudson in Wellington. The male holotype is held at the Natural History Museum, London.

Description

Meyrick described this species as follows:

Distribution
This species is endemic to New Zealand. Specimens have been collected at Wellington, Whangarei, Gisborne, Mount Taranaki and at the Nelson Lakes National Park .

Habitat and host species

T. hieropis inhabits native forest. The larvae of this species feeds on the leaf litter of kānuka.

Behaviour
Adult species are on the wing in December. This species is attracted to light.

References 

Moths described in 1892
Oecophoridae
Taxa named by Edward Meyrick
Moths of New Zealand
Endemic fauna of New Zealand
Endemic moths of New Zealand